Chrysallida communis is a species of sea snail, a marine gastropod mollusk in the family Pyramidellidae, the pyrams and their allies. The species is one of multiple species within the Chrysallida genus of gastropods.

References

External links
 To World Register of Marine Species

communis
Gastropods described in 1852